Harum Scarum may refer to:

 Harum Scarum (film), 1965 film starring Elvis Presley
 Harum Scarum (album), soundtrack of the film

See also
Harem Scarem (disambiguation)